This is a list of victories of the  cycling team.

Sources:

1999 Lampre–Daikin

Criterium Aalst, Ludo Dierckxsens
Clásica de Almería, Ján Svorada
Stage 3 Vuelta Ciclista a Murcia, Ján Svorada
Stage 8 Tirreno – Adriatico, Ján Svorada
Stage 7 Deutschland Tour, Raivis Belohvoščiks
Stage 4 Tour de Suisse, Gabriele Missaglia
Stage 8 Tour de Suisse, Oscar Camenzind
 Road Race Championship, Ludo Dierckxsens
Stage 11 Tour de France, Ludo Dierckxsens
Stage 1 Vuelta a España, Robbie Hunter

2000 Lampre–Daikin

Antwerpen na-tour Dernyspektakel, Ludo Dierckxsens
Stage 2 Tirreno–Adriatico, Ján Svorada
Stage 1 Vuelta Ciclista al Pais Vasco, Massimo Codol
Stage 3 Giro d'Italia, Ján Svorada
Stage 14 Giro d'Italia, Gilberto Simoni
Stage 21 Giro d'Italia, Mariano Piccoli
Stage 3 Euskal Bizikleta, Marco Serpellini
 Time Trial Championship, Robbie Hunter
Overall Tour de Suisse, Oscar Camenzind
Stage 5, Raivis Belohvoščiks
Stage 4  Volta Ciclista a Catalunya, Gabriele Missaglia
 Time Trial Championship, Raivis Belohvoščiks
Vattenfall Cyclassics, Gabriele Missaglia
Stages 2 & 3a Ronde van Nederland, Robbie Hunter
Stage 5 Tour de Pologne, Marco Pinotti
Stage 13 Vuelta a España, Marco Pinotti
Stage 16 Vuelta a España, Gilberto Simoni
Stage 19 Vuelta a España, Mariano Piccoli
Gran Premio Industria e Commercio di Prato, Sergio Barbero
Giro dell´Emilia, Gilberto Simoni
G.P. Beghelli, Marco Serpellini
Japan Cup, Massimo Codol

2001 Lampre–Daikin

Antwerpen na-tour Dernyspektakel, Ludo Dierckxsens
Profronde van Almelo, Ludo Dierckxsens
Ronde van Pijnacker, Ján Svorada
Liège – Bastogne – Liège, Oscar Camenzind
Stage 3 4 Jours de Dunkerque, Ján Svorada
Stage 4 Tour de Romandie, Gilberto Simoni
Overall Giro d'Italia, Gilberto Simoni
Stage 20, Gilberto Simoni
Stage 4 Tour de Luxembourg, Raivis Belohvoščiks
Stage 10  Tour de Suisse, Oscar Camenzind
 Time Trial Championship, Raivis Belohvoščiks
Stage 20 Tour de France, Ján Svorada
Tour de Rijke, Robbie Hunter
Stage 14 Vuelta a España, Juan Manuel Gárate
Stage 17 Vuelta a España, Robbie Hunter
Stage 20 Vuelta a España, Gilberto Simoni
Japan Cup, Gilberto Simoni

2002 Lampre–Daikin

Nacht van Peer, Ludo Dierckxsens
GP Chiasso, Rubens Bertogliati
Stage 4 Tour of Qatar, Alberto Loddo
Stages 1 & 4 Tour de Belgique, Ján Svorada
Stage 17 Giro d'Italia, Pavel Tonkov
Stage 7 Tour de Suisse, Juan Manuel Gárate
 Time Trial Championship, Raivis Belohvoščiks
 Road Race Championship, Raivis Belohvoščiks
Japan Cup, Sergio Barbero

2003 Lampre–Caffita

Criterium d´Abruzzo, Matteo Carrara
Overall Tour of Qatar, Alberto Loddo
Stage 1, Alberto Loddo
Stages 2, 3 & 4 Tour de Langkawi, Luciano Pagliarini
Clásica de Almería, Luciano Pagliarini
Stage 4 Vuelta Ciclista al Pais Vasco, Marco Pinotti
Stage 1  Tour de Romandie, Simone Bertoletti
Stage 4a Euskal Bizikleta, Francesco Casagrande
Stage 5 Tour of Austria, Matteo Carrara
Stages 3 & 5 Tour de Suisse, Francesco Casagrande
GP Città´ di Camaiore, Marco Serpellini
Coppa Ugo Agostoni, Francesco Casagrande
Coppa Bernocchi, Sergio Barbero
Trofeo Melinda, Francesco Casagrande
Japan Cup, Sergio Barbero

2004 Lampre–Caffita

Profronde van Made, Igor Astarloa
Stages, 1, 7 & 8 Tour de Langkawi, Luciano Pagliarini
Stage 4 Giro del Trentino, Ján Svorada
Stage 1 Tour de Romandie, Ján Svorada
Stage 1 Tour de Belgique, Gianluca Bortolami
Giro Ciclistico d´Italia, Marco Marzano
Stage 1 Brixia Tour, Igor Astarloa
Giro di Romagna et Coppa Placci, Gianluca Bortolami

2005 Lampre

Stage 5 Paris–Nice, Gilberto Simoni
Stage 1 Driedaagse van De Panne, Alessandro Ballan
Giro dell'Appennino, Gilberto Simoni
Stage 3 Tour de Romandie, Damiano Cunego
Giro di Toscana, Daniele Bennati
 Road Race Championships, Gerrit Glomser
Stage 4 Eneco Tour, Alessandro Ballan
Stages 3, 5 & 9 Deutschland Tour, Daniele Bennati
Giro del Veneto, Eddy Mazzoleni
Gran Premio Nobili Rubinetterie, Damiano Cunego
Trofeo Melinda, Damiano Cunego
Stages 2 & 4 Tour de Pologne, Daniele Bennati
Giro dell'Emilia, Gilberto Simoni
Japan Cup, Damiano Cunego

2006 Lampre–Fondital

Stage 1 Tour Méditerranéen, Danilo Napolitano
Trofeo Laigueglia, Alessandro Ballan
Stage 5 Volta a la Comunitat Valenciana, Daniele Bennati
Stage 3 Paris–Nice, Patxi Vila
Overall Settimana Internazionale di Coppi e Bartali, Damiano Cunego
Stages 1a & 4, Danilo Napolitano
Stage 3, Damiano Cunego
Giro d'Oro, Damiano Cunego
Overall Giro del Trentino, Damiano Cunego
Stage 2, Damiano Cunego
Stage 4, Daniele Bennati
GP Industria & Artigianato di Larciano, Damiano Cunego
Stage 7 Volta a Catalunya, Daniele Bennati
Memorial Marco Pantani, Daniele Bennati
 Time Trial Championships, Marzio Bruseghin
Stages 1 & 5 Tour of Austria, Danilo Napolitano
Stage 3a Brixia Tour, Danilo Napolitano
Stage 3b Brixia Tour, Giuliano Figueras
Giro del Lazio, Giuliano Figueras
Coppa Bernocchi, Danilo Napolitano
Stages 2 & 4 Tour de Pologne, Daniele Bennati
Gran Premio Città di Misano – Adriatico, Daniele Bennati
Gran Premio Industria e Commercio di Prato, Daniele Bennati
Giro del Piemonte, Daniele Bennati

2007 Lampre–Fondital

Stage 2 Tour Méditerranéen, Daniele Bennati
Stage 1, 3 & 5 Volta a la Comunitat Valenciana, Daniele Bennati
Stage 5 Vuelta a Murcia, Danilo Napolitano
Stage 6 Tirreno Adriatico, Matteo Bono
Overall Three Days of De Panne, Alessandro Ballan
Stage 2, Daniele Bennati
Tour of Flanders, Alessandro Ballan
Overall Giro del Trentino, Damiano Cunego
Stage 1 & 2, Damiano Cunego
Stage 3 Tour de Romandie, Matteo Bono
Stage 9 Giro d'Italia, Danilo Napolitano
Stage 13 Giro d'Italia, Marzio Bruseghin
Trofeo Super Team classification, Giro d'Italia
Stage 1 Tour of Slovenia, Danilo Napolitano
 Road Race Championship, Tadej Valjavec
Stage 1 Tour of Austria, Fabio Baldato
Stage 17 & 20 Tour de France, Daniele Bennati
Stage 4 Deutschland Tour, Damiano Cunego
Vattenfall Cyclassics, Alessandro Ballan
Coppa Bernocchi, Danilo Napolitano
Stage 1, 17 & 21 Vuelta a España, Daniele Bennati
Stage 1 Tour de Pologne, Team Time Trial
Stage 4 Tour de Pologne, Danilo Napolitano
Gran Premio Città di Misano – Adriatico, Danilo Napolitano
Gran Premio Bruno Beghelli, Damiano Cunego
Giro di Lombardia, Damiano Cunego

2008 Lampre

Stage 5 Tour of Qatar, Danilo Napolitano
Stage 3 Giro della Provincia di Grosseto, Danilo Napolitano
Stage 4 Volta a la Comunitat Valenciana, Mirco Lorenzetto
Stage 5 Volta a la Comunitat Valenciana, Danilo Napolitano
Stage 5 Tour of the Basque Country, Damiano Cunego
Klasika Primavera, Damiano Cunego
Stage 2 Presidential Cycling Tour of Turkey, Mirco Lorenzetto
Amstel Gold Race, Damiano Cunego
Stage 10 Giro d'Italia, Marzio Bruseghin
Stage 1a Brixia Tour, Danilo Napolitano
Stage 1 & 2 Volta a Portugal, Danilo Napolitano
Stage 7 Vuelta a España, Alessandro Ballan
Road World Championships, Alessandro Ballan
Giro di Lombardia, Damiano Cunego
Japan Cup, Damiano Cunego

2009 Lampre–NGC

Stage 1 & 2 Giro di Sardegna, Mirco Lorenzetto
Giro del Friuli, Mirco Lorenzetto
Overall Settimana Internazionale di Coppi e Bartali, Damiano Cunego
Stage 2 & 3, Damiano Cunego
Stage 2 Critérium du Dauphiné Libéré, Angelo Furlan
Stage 3 Tour of Slovenia, Simon Špilak
Overall Tour de Pologne, Alessandro Ballan
Stage 2, Angelo Furlan
Stage 5, Alessandro Ballan
Tre Valli Varesine, Mauro Santambrogio
Stage 8 & 14 Vuelta a España, Damiano Cunego
Rund um die Nürnberger Altstadt, Francesco Gavazzi
Stage 1 Tour of Hainan, Vitaliy Buts

2010 Lampre–Farnese Vini

Stages 2 & 4 Giro della Provincia di Reggio Calabria, Alessandro Petacchi
Gran Premio della Costa Etruschi, Alessandro Petacchi
Stage 1 Giro di Sardegna, Francesco Gavazzi
Stage 3 Giro di Sardegna, Alessandro Petacchi
Stage 4 Giro di Sardegna, Danilo Hondo
Stage 3 Tour of the Basque Country, Francesco Gavazzi
Overall Tour de Romandie, Simon Špilak
Stage 4, Simon Špilak
Stage 5 Bayern Rundfahrt, Marcin Sapa
Stage 1 Critérium du Dauphiné, Grega Bole
Stage 4 Tour de Suisse, Alessandro Petacchi
Stages 1 & 2 Tour of Slovenia, Grega Bole
Stages 1 & 4 Tour de France, Alessandro Petacchi
 Points classification, Alessandro Petacchi
Stage 4 Tour de Pologne, Mirco Lorenzetto
Coppa Ugo Agostoni, Francesco Gavazzi
Stage 7 Vuelta a España, Alessandro Petacchi
Gran Premio Industria e Commercio di Prato, Diego Ulissi

2011 Lampre–ISD

Overall Giro della Provincia di Reggio Calabria, Daniele Pietropolli
Stage 1, Daniele Pietropolli
Trofeo Laigueglia, Daniele Pietropolli
Stage 2 Giro di Sardegna, Damiano Cunego
Stage 5 Giro di Sardegna, Michele Scarponi
Stage 4 Tirreno–Adriatico, Michele Scarponi
Stage 2 Volta a Catalunya, Alessandro Petacchi
Stage 4 Settimana Internazionale di Coppi e Bartali, Adriano Malori
Stage 5 Tour of the Basque Country, Francesco Gavazzi
Giro dell'Appennino, Damiano Cunego
 Overall Giro del Trentino, Michele Scarponi
Stage 4 Presidential Cycling Tour of Turkey, Alessandro Petacchi
Stage 2 Tour de Romandie, Damiano Cunego
Stage 2 Giro d'Italia, Alessandro Petacchi
Stage 17 Giro d'Italia, Diego Ulissi
 Overall Tour of Slovenia, Diego Ulissi
Stage 2, Diego Ulissi
 Road Race Championships, Grega Bole
 Road Race Championships, Oleksandr Kvachuk
 Time Trial Championships, Oleksandr Kvachuk
 Time Trial Championships, Adriano Malori
Stages 6 & 10 Volta a Portugal, Francesco Gavazzi
Stage 5 Eneco Tour, Matteo Bono
GP Ouest-France, Grega Bole
Stage 18 Vuelta a España, Francesco Gavazzi
 Overall Giro d'Italia, Michele Scarponi

2012 Lampre–ISD
Stages 3 & 4 Settimana Internazionale di Coppi e Bartali, Diego Ulissi
Stage 2 Giro del Trentino, Damiano Cunego
Stages 1, 3 & 5 Bayern Rundfahrt, Alessandro Petacchi
Gran Premio Industria e Commercio Artigianato Carnaghese, Diego Ulissi

2013 Lampre–Merida

Stage 2 La Tropicale Amissa Bongo, Andrea Palini
Trofeo Laigueglia, Filippo Pozzato
 Overall Settimana Internazionale di Coppi e Bartali, Diego Ulissi
Stage 2, Diego Ulissi
Stage 3, Damiano Cunego
Stage 4 (ITT), Adriano Malori
 Overall Bayern Rundfahrt, Adriano Malori
Stage 4 (ITT), Adriano Malori
Stage 1 Tour de Pologne, Diego Ulissi
Coppa Ugo Agostoni, Filippo Pozzato
Tre Valli Varesine, Kristijan Đurasek
GP Ouest-France, Filippo Pozzato
Gran Premio della Costa Etruschi, Michele Scarponi
Milano–Torino, Diego Ulissi
Coppa Sabatini, Diego Ulissi
Giro dell'Emilia, Diego Ulissi

2014 Lampre–Merida

Stage 2 Tour Down Under, Diego Ulissi
Stage 7 Tour de San Luis, Sacha Modolo
Trofeo Palma, Sacha Modolo
Trofeo Ses Salines, Sacha Modolo
Stage 1 Volta ao Algarve, Sacha Modolo
Trofeo Laigueglia, José Serpa
Gran Premio Città di Camaiore, Diego Ulissi
Stages 2 & 3a Three Days of De Panne, Sacha Modolo
Stages 5 & 8 Giro d'Italia, Diego Ulissi
Stage 6 Tour of Japan, Niccolò Bonifazio
 Overall Tour de Suisse, Rui Costa
Stage 5, Sacha Modolo
Stage 9, Rui Costa
 Time Trial Championships, Nelson Oliveira 
 Road RaceChampionships, Nelson Oliveira 
Stage 9 Vuelta a España, Winner Anacona
Stage 15 Vuelta a España, Przemysław Niemiec
Coppa Ugo Agostoni – Giro delle Brianze, Niccolò Bonifazio
Gran Premio Bruno Beghelli, Valerio Conti
Stage 5 Tour of Beijing, Sacha Modolo
Stages 2, 6 & 8 Tour of Hainan, Niccolò Bonifazio
Stage 5 Tour of Hainan, Andrea Palini

2015 Lampre–Merida

African Continental Time Trial Championships, Tsgabu Grmay
Trofeo Laigueglia, Davide Cimolai
 Overall Tour of Oman, Rafael Valls
Stage 4, Rafael Valls
Gran Premio di Lugano, Niccolò Bonifazio
Stage 5 Paris–Nice, Davide Cimolai
 Overall, Tour of Turkey, Kristijan Đurasek
Stage 5, Sacha Modolo
Stage 5 Giro d'Italia, Jan Polanc
Stage 7 Giro d'Italia, Diego Ulissi
Stages 13 & 17 Giro d'Italia, Sacha Modolo
Stage 6 Tour of Japan, Valerio Conti
Stage 7 Tour of Japan, Niccolò Bonifazio
Stage 6 Critérium du Dauphiné, Rui Costa
Stage 2 Tour de Suisse, Kristijan Đurasek
 Time Trial Championships, Nelson Oliveira
 Road Race Championships, Rui Costa
 Time Trial Championships, Tsgabu Grmay
 Road Race Championships, Tsgabu Grmay
 Road Race Championships, Luka Pibernik
Stage 7 Tour of Qinghai Lake, Ilia Koshevoy
Stage 16 Tour de France, Rubén Plaza
Stage 13 Vuelta a España, Nelson Oliveira
Stage 20 Vuelta a España, Rubén Plaza
Chrono Champenois, Filippo Ganna
Memorial Marco Pantani, Diego Ulissi
Overall Tour of Hainan, Sacha Modolo
Stages 3 & 4, Sacha Modolo

2016 Lampre–Merida

Stage 6 Volta a Catalunya, Davide Cimolai
Stage 1 Tour of Turkey, Przemysław Niemiec
Stages 4 & 7 Tour of Turkey, Sacha Modolo
Stages 4 & 11 Giro d'Italia, Diego Ulissi
Stage 2 Tour of Japan, Davide Cimolai
Stage 7 Tour of Japan, Yukiya Arashiro
Stage 3 (ITT) Tour of Slovenia, Diego Ulissi
Stage 7 Tour of Qinghai Lake, Federico Zurlo
Stages 9 & 10 Tour of Qinghai Lake, Marko Kump
Circuito de Getxo, Diego Ulissi
 Overall Czech Cycling Tour, Diego Ulissi
Stage 2, Sacha Modolo
Stage 3, Diego Ulissi
Stage 6 Eneco Tour, Luka Pibernik
Stage 13 Vuelta a España, Valerio Conti
Stage 6 Tour of Hainan, Matej Mohorič

2017 UAE Abu Dhabi / UAE Team Emirates

Stage 5 Vuelta a San Juan, Rui Costa
G.P. Costa degli Etruschi, Diego Ulissi
 Overall Abu Dhabi Tour, Rui Costa
Stage 3, Rui Costa
 Time Trial Championships, Yousif Mirza
 Road Race Championships, Yousif Mirza
Stages 1 & 6 Tour of Croatia, Sacha Modolo
Stage 2 Tour of Croatia, Kristijan Đurasek
Stage 4 Giro d'Italia, Jan Polanc
Grand Prix of Aargau Canton, Sacha Modolo
 Time Trial Championships, Jan Polanc
Stage 2 Tour de Pologne, Sacha Modolo
Stage 7 Vuelta a España, Matej Mohorič
Grand Prix Cycliste de Montréal, Diego Ulissi
Hong Kong Challenge, Matej Mohorič
 UEC European Track Championships – Individual Pursuit, Filippo Ganna

2018 UAE Team Emirates

Asian Continental Road Race Championships, Yousif Mirza
Stage 6 Tour of Oman, Alexander Kristoff
Stage 1 Abu Dhabi Tour, Alexander Kristoff
 Time Trial Championships, Yousif Mirza
 Road Race Championships, Yousif Mirza
 World Track Championships (Individual Pursuit), Filippo Ganna
Eschborn–Frankfurt, Alexander Kristoff
Grand Prix of Aargau Canton, Alexander Kristoff
Stage 5 Critérium du Dauphiné, Daniel Martin
Stage 1 Tour of Slovenia, Simone Consonni
Stage 5 Tour de Suisse, Diego Ulissi
 National Road Race Championships, Vegard Stake Laengen
Stage 6 Tour de France, Daniel Martin
Stage 21 Tour de France, Alexander Kristoff
 UEC European Track Championships – Individual Pursuit, Filippo Ganna

2019 UAE Team Emirates

Stage 5 Tour Down Under, Jasper Philipsen
Stages 1 & 4 Vuelta a San Juan, Fernando Gaviria
Stage 3 Tour Colombia, Juan Sebastián Molano 
Stage 1 Tour of Oman, Alexander Kristoff
 Time Trial Championships, Yousif Mirza
 Overall Volta ao Algarve, Tadej Pogačar
Stage 2, Tadej Pogačar
Stage 2 UAE Tour, Fernando Gaviria
 Road Race Championships, Yousif Mirza
Gent–Wevelgem, Alexander Kristoff
Stage 3 Giro d'Italia, Fernando Gaviria
 Overall Tour of California, Tadej Pogačar
Stage 6, Tadej Pogačar
 Overall Tour of Norway, Alexander Kristoff
Stage 5, Alexander Kristoff
 Time Trial Championships, Tadej Pogačar
GP Lugano, Diego Ulissi
Grand Prix of Aargau Canton, Alexander Kristoff
 Overall Tour of Slovenia, Diego Ulissi
Stage 3, Diego Ulissi
Stage 2 Deutschland Tour, Alexander Kristoff
 Young rider classification Vuelta a España, Tadej Pogačar
Stages 9, 13 & 20, Tadej Pogačar
Coppa Ugo Agostoni, Alexandr Riabushenko
Stage 1a Okolo Slovenska, Alexander Kristoff

2020 UAE Team Emirates

Stages 2, 4 & 7 Vuelta a San Juan, Fernando Gaviria
Stage 1 Tour of Saudi Arabia, Rui Costa
 Overall Volta a la Comunitat Valenciana, Tadej Pogačar 
Stages 2 & 4, Tadej Pogačar
Stages 2, 3 & 5 Tour Colombia, Juan Sebastián Molano
Stage 5 UAE Tour, Tadej Pogačar
 Time Trial Championships, Tadej Pogačar
Stage 2 Vuelta a Burgos, Fernando Gaviria
Stage 3 Critérium du Dauphiné, Davide Formolo
 Time Trial Championships, Ivo Oliveira
 Road Race Championships, Rui Costa
Stage 2 Tour du Limousin, Fernando Gaviria
Stage 3 Tour du Limousin, Jasper Philipsen
 National Road Race Championships, Sven Erik Bystrøm
Trofeo Matteotti, Valerio Conti
 Overall Tour de France, Tadej Pogačar
 Mountains classification, Tadej Pogačar
 Young rider classification, Tadej Pogačar
Stage 1, Alexander Kristoff
Stages 9, 15 & 20 (ITT), Tadej Pogačar
 Overall Tour de Luxembourg, Diego Ulissi
Stages 1 & 4, Diego Ulissi
Giro di Toscana, Fernando Gaviria
Stage 1 BinckBank Tour, Jasper Philipsen
Stages 2 & 13 Giro d'Italia, Diego Ulissi
Stage 15 Vuelta a España, Jasper Philipsen
 UEC European Track Championships – Individual Pursuit, Ivo Oliveira

2021 UAE Team Emirates

 Overall UAE Tour, Tadej Pogačar
Stage 3, Tadej Pogačar
African Continental Championships, Time Trial, Ryan Gibbons
 Road Race Championships, Yousif Mirza
 Time Trial Championships, Yousif Mirza
African Continental Championships, Road Race, Ryan Gibbons
 Overall Tirreno–Adriatico, Tadej Pogačar
Stage 4, Tadej Pogačar 
 Time Trial Championships, Ryan Gibbons
Stage 3 Tour of the Basque Country, Tadej Pogačar
Liège–Bastogne–Liège, Tadej Pogačar
Stage 4 Giro d'Italia, Joe Dombrowski
Trofeo Calvià, Ryan Gibbons
 Overall Tour of Slovenia, Tadej Pogačar
Stage 2, Tadej Pogačar
Stage 4, Diego Ulissi
 Overall Tour de France, Tadej Pogačar
 Mountains classification, Tadej Pogačar
 Young rider classification, Tadej Pogačar
Stages 5 (ITT), 17 & 18, Tadej Pogačar
 Overall Settimana Ciclistica Italiana, Diego Ulissi 
Stages 1 & 4, Diego Ulissi  
Stages 2 & 4 Vuelta a Burgos, Juan Sebastián Molano 
Stage 3 Tour de Pologne, Fernando Gaviria 
Stages 2 & 4 Deutschland Tour, Alexander Kristoff 
Stage 15 Vuelta a España, Rafał Majka 
Stage 2 Tour de Luxembourg, Marc Hirschi
Trofeo Matteotti, Matteo Trentin
Stages 1 & 2 Giro di Sicilia, Juan Sebastián Molano 
Giro di Lombardia, Tadej Pogačar

2022 UAE Team Emirates

Trofeo Calvià, Brandon McNulty
Stages 1 & 6 Tour of Oman, Fernando Gaviria
Vuelta a Murcia, Alessandro Covi
Stage 2 Vuelta a Andalucía, Alessandro Covi
 Overall UAE Tour, Tadej Pogačar
Stages 4 & 7, Tadej Pogačar
Faun-Ardèche Classic, Brandon McNulty
Le Samyn, Matteo Trentin
Trofeo Laigueglia, Jan Polanc
 Time Trial Championships, Yousif Mirza
Strade Bianche, Tadej Pogačar
Stage 5 Paris–Nice, Brandon McNulty
 Overall Tirreno–Adriatico, Tadej Pogačar
Stages 4 & 6, Tadej Pogačar 
 Road Race Championships, Yousif Mirza
Bredene Koksijde Classic, Pascal Ackermann
Per sempre Alfredo, Marc Hirschi
Stage 4 Volta a Catalunya, João Almeida
GP Industria & Artigianato, Diego Ulissi
Stage 20 Giro d'Italia, Alessandro Covi
Stage 4 Boucles de la Mayenne, Juan Sebastián Molano
Grand Prix of Aargau Canton, Marc Hirschi
 Overall Tour of Slovenia, Tadej Pogačar
Stages 1 & 4, Rafał Majka
Stages 3 & 5, Tadej Pogačar
 Time Trial Championships, Joel Suter
 Road Race Championships, João Almeida
 Young rider classification Tour de France, Tadej Pogačar
Stages 6, 7 & 17, Tadej Pogačar
Circuito de Getxo, Juan Ayuso
Stage 4 Tour de Pologne, Pascal Ackermann
Stage 5 Vuelta a Burgos, João Almeida
Stage 3 Tour du Limousin, Diego Ulissi
Stage 5 Vuelta a España, Marc Soler
Stage 21 Vuelta a España, Juan Sebastián Molano
Grand Prix Cycliste de Montréal, Tadej Pogačar
Stage 2 Tour de Luxembourg, Matteo Trentin
Giro di Toscana, Marc Hirschi
Tre Valli Varesine, Tadej Pogačar
Il Lombardia, Tadej Pogačar
Giro del Veneto, Matteo Trentin
Veneto Classic, Marc Hirschi

2023 UAE Team Emirates
 
 Time Trial Championships, Jay Vine
 Overall Tour Down Under, Jay Vine
Clásica Jaén Paraíso Interior, Tadej Pogačar
Stage 4 Tour of Oman, Diego Ulissi
 Overall Vuelta a Andalucía, Tadej Pogačar
Stages 1, 2 & 4, Tadej Pogačar
Stage 3, Tim Wellens
Stage 4 UAE Tour, Juan Sebastián Molano
Stage 7 UAE Tour, Adam Yates
 Overall Paris–Nice, Tadej Pogačar
Stages 4, 7 & 8, Tadej Pogačar

Supplementary statistics
Sources

1999 to 2019

2020 to present

Notes

References

Colnago
Wins